Deux-Montagnes is a suburban municipality in southwestern Quebec, Canada on the north shore of the Rivière des Mille Îles where it flows out of Lake of Two Mountains (Lac des Deux Montagnes). It is part of the Deux-Montagnes Regional County Municipality in the greater Montreal region.

Description
Ten thousand years ago, the Champlain Sea covered a large part of southern Quebec and left behind the clay, sand and peat soil that is now under the city of Deux-Montagnes. When the sea retreated to the Atlantic Ocean, along the channel that is now the St-Lawrence River and its tributaries, the Rivière-des-Milles-Iles and the Lake of Two-Mountains, southern Quebec became a favourable area for hunting and gathering. (Plante p. 129)

The name "Deux-Montagnes" (French for "Two Mountains") dates to 1674 when it was given to the lake bordering on the municipality, and to the seigneury which stood north of the lake.  Founded as the Village Municipality of Saint-Eustache-sur-le-Lac in 1921, it became a city in 1958, and changed its name to Deux-Montagnes in 1963.

Deux-Montagnes Library
In 1946, when the parish of St-Agapit was established, Father Chartrand, the parish’s first curate donated his selection of books to start a public library. These books were located in the rectory and then moved to the church basement. The books were eventually transferred to the local Club Femina where Annette Magnan offered many services in the St-Eustache-sur-le-lac library until her death in 1975. The books were sold and the Club Femina moved to other premises.

A group of citizens formed a committee in order to create a public library and the city adopted a by-law establishing the Municipal Library of Deux-Montagnes on January 12, 1978. The new books bought by the city council, were moved to the new premises in the community center on March 1, 1978. Internet access was introduced in the library in 1997 to further modernize the premises.

Transportation
The municipality has two commuter train stations, on the Deux-Montagnes line: Deux-Montagnes and Grand-Moulin.

Education
The Commission scolaire de la Seigneurie-des-Mille-Îles (CSSMI) operates Francophone schools. The Sir Wilfrid Laurier School Board (SWLSB) operates Anglophone schools.

The little yellow schoolhouse, located at the corner of 14th avenue and Chemin d’Oka, was the only educational institution during the 1940s. At the time, English and French students were accepted. A teacher earned $300 annually and was provided lodging on the second floor. The school was shut down in the 1960s because of a population increase in the area and the new construction of St-Jude School. (Plante p. 182)

English language schools
 Lake Of Two Mountains High School (LTM)
The original Lake of Two Mountains High School was at the corner of 14th avenue and Chemin d’Oka where its first class graduated in 1954. A new building was built in 1981 on Guy street and still stands here today.

The Lake of Two Mountains High School serves students from neighbouring towns including Deux-Montagnes, Kanesatake, Mirabel (St-Augustin Sector and St-Benoit sector), Oka, Pointe-Calumet, St-Joseph-du-Lac St-Eustache, St-Placide and St-Marthe-sur-le-lac.

 St. Jude Elementary School
In 1949 Saint-Jude Elementary School was built on Saint-Jude Street, behind the Saint-Agapit Church because the town was experiencing a population boom. In 1953, the school reached its total capacity of students and resulted in the building of the Sauvé School. (Plante p. 183)

 Mountainview Elementary School
Built in the early 1960s on the corner of Guy Street and 20th Avenue, St-Eustache sur-le-Lac Elementary School (as it was originally called) served the English-speaking, non-catholic (i.e.Protestant) community, before the implementation of the non-denominational school board system throughout Quebec. The school still operates today, as Mountainview Elementary, as part of the Sir-Wilfrid-Laurier School Board. (S. Menard, alumni).

French language schools

High school
 École Polyvalente Deux-Montagnes (PDM)

Elementary schools
 École Sauvé
Sauvé Elementary School, opened in 1953, and taught children from grades 1 to 9. In 1957 a second floor was added to the building because of the growing number of children in St-Eustache-sur-le-Lac. In the 1959-60 school year, French primary students were taught on the first floor and English primary students were taught on the second floor. Because of the ongoing population growth, it was decided in 1961 that all French students would attend Sauvé School and all English Students would attend Saint-Jude School. (Plante p. 184)

 École Emmanuel-Chénard
 École des Mésanges

Continuing education
 Centre de formation professionnelle, l'Émergence

Special needs school
 École des Érables

Community associations

The Lions Club
The Deux-Montagnes Lions Club is part of the service club organization Lions Club International. The Lions Club International was founded in 1917 by Melvin Jones and today has 1.35 million volunteers in more than 46,000 clubs. Its mission is to  "empower volunteers to serve their communities, meet humanitarian needs, encourage peace and promote international understanding through Lions clubs."

4 Korners Family Resource Center
The 4 Korners Family Resource Center is a non-profit organization that seeks to provide English resources for children, adults and seniors in the Laurentian region. The services offered by 4 Korners are information, referrals, interpretation, accompaniment and support.

Parishes

Saint-Agapit Parish

In 1930 a new chapel was built in response to a request from parishioners of St-Eustache-sur-le-lac, where Monseigneur George Gauthier, Archbishop of Montreal gave permission to replace the small Bélair chapel, that was "located on the Chemin du Grand-Moulin at the foot of De La Chapelle street, on the banks of the Rivière des Mille Îles"(Plante, p. 174). The Parish of Saint-Agapit was officially founded on July 7, 1946.
On April 12, 1961 a violent explosion occurred in the basement of the church while 150 children were inside. The children all ran out, and only the chimney remained from this incident.
On August 28, 1962 the new Saint-Agapit Church was officially inaugurated after parishioners carried numerous fundraisers to rebuild their church. (Plante p. 174-176)

Holy Family Parish

Most Reverend Emilien Frenette, who was then Bishop of Saint-Jerome, founded the Holy Family Parish on December 26, 1957. This parish served and continues to serve the English Catholic community of Deux-Montagnes. (Plante p. 178)

Christ Church United

The history of the United Church of Canada began in the early 1800s. By 1838, the English community of Protestants of St-Eustache built a church where its members attended until 1926. This community attended their first meeting on August 19, 1927, "in the new church built by volunteers on the corner of 8th and Cedar avenues" (Plante p. 179).

The first pastor of the Community Church of the United Church of Canada, Stan Kennedy was welcomed on July 1, 1953. During his charge, he decided to sell the church built in 1927. The new church was built on 14th avenue, across from the original Lake of Two-Mountains High School, on July 30, 1955. (Plante p. 180)

People’s Church

The Evangelical People’s Church, was built and founded on 5th avenue in April 1964. (Plante p. 181)

All Saints Church

In 1946 at the "little yellow schoolhouse", a dozen faithful Anglicans met in a classroom and began the history of the Anglican community in Deux-Montagnes. Because of the demand for a bigger space, the congregation moved to a mansion on the corner of 11th avenue and Boulevard du Lac, and renovated and enlarged the premises. The church moved to a bigger location in 1955, on 18th avenue. (Plante p. 182)

Demographics 

Population trend:
 Population in 2011: 17,552 (2006 to 2011 population change: 0.9%)
 Population in 2006: 17,402 (2001 to 2006 population change: 1.9%)
 Population in 2001: 17,080
 Population in 1996: 15,953
 Population in 1991: 13,035

Mother tongue
 French: 75.52%
 English: 13.84%
 Other languages: 7.70%
 English and French: 1.89%

Sport associations
 Hockey Association - Deux-Montagnes Panthères
 Soccer Association - Deux-Montagnes Shamrocks
 Deux-Montagnes Softball Association
 Basketball Deux-Montagnes - Founded by Bob Fordham
 Senior Soccer Association - Two Mountains Senior Soccer Club
 Baseball Association - Deux-Montagnes Cardinals
 Centurions Deux-Montagnes - Polyvalente Deux-Montagnes
 ARDM (ringuette Association) - Deux-Montagnes Coyotes

Notable persons
 Glen Drover - Musician
 Shawn Drover - Musician
 Mikaël Kingsbury - Freestyle Skier
 Fanny Letourneau - Synchronized Swimmer
 Ken McGoogan - Author
 A. Lawrence Vaincourt - Author
 Danièle Sauvageau - Women's Hockey Coach

References

External links

 Ville de Deux-Montagnes (French/English)

Cities and towns in Quebec
Incorporated places in Laurentides
Greater Montreal